Estadio de Vallejo was a multi-use stadium in Valencia, Spain. It was initially used as the stadium of Levante UD matches.  It was replaced by the current Estadi Ciutat de València in 1969.  The capacity of the stadium was 18,000 spectators.

References

External links
Estadios de España 

Levante UD
Vallejo
Sports venues in the Valencian Community
Sports venues completed in 1925
1925 establishments in Spain
1968 disestablishments in Spain